Platylomalus aequalis is a species of clown beetles in the family Histeridae. It is found in North America.

References

 Bousquet, Yves, and Serge Laplante (2006). "Coleoptera Histeridae". The Insects and Arachnids of Canada, part 24, xiii + 485.
 Mazur, Slawomir (1997). "A world catalogue of the Histeridae (Coleoptera: Histeroidea)". Genus, International Journal of Invertebrate Taxonomy (Supplement), 373.

Further reading

 Arnett, R.H. Jr., M. C. Thomas, P. E. Skelley and J. H. Frank. (eds.). (2002). American Beetles, Volume II: Polyphaga: Scarabaeoidea through Curculionoidea. CRC Press LLC, Boca Raton, FL.
 Arnett, Ross H. (2000). American Insects: A Handbook of the Insects of America North of Mexico. CRC Press.
 Richard E. White. (1983). Peterson Field Guides: Beetles. Houghton Mifflin Company.

External links

 NCBI Taxonomy Browser, Platylomalus aequalis

Histeridae
Beetles described in 1825